Aubergine is a British and Irish term for eggplant.

Aubergine may also refer to:

 Aubergine (color)
 Aubergine (London restaurant)
 Aubergine (Netherlands restaurant)

See also
 Eggplant (disambiguation)